Li-Book 2000 is the second live album by Masami Okui, released on November 22, 2000.

Track listing
Turning Point
 Lyrics: Masami Okui
 Composition, arrangement: Toshiro Yabuki

 OVA Starship Girl Yamamoto Yohko opening song
 Lyrics: Masami Okui
 Composition, arrangement: Toshiro Yabuki

 Radio drama Slayers N.EX ending song
 Lyrics, composition: Masami Okui
 Arrangement: Toshiro Yabuki
Endless Life
 PS game Advanced V.G.2 theme song

 Lyrics: Masami Okui
 Composition, arrangement: Toshiro Yabuki
Chaos
 Lyrics, composition: Masami Okui
 Arrangement: Hideki Satou
Cutie
 Anime television series Di Gi Charat Summer Special 2000 opening song
 Lyrics: Masami Okui
 Composition, arrangement: Toshiro Yabuki

 Anime television series Revolutionary Girl Utena opening song
 Lyrics: Masami Okui
 Composition, arrangement: Toshiro Yabuki
Kitto Ashita wa
 Anime television series Ojamajo Doremi ending song
 Lyrics, composition: Masami Okui
 Arrangement: Tsutomu Ohira
Sunrise Sunset
 Lyrics, composition: Masami Okui
 Arrangement: Itaru Watanabe
Kiss in the Dark
 PS game Evil Zone theme song
 Lyrics, composition: Masami Okui
 Arrangement: Tsutomu Ohira
Just do it
 Lyrics: Masami Okui
 Composition, arrangement: Toshiro Yabuki

 Lyrics: Masami Okui
 Composition, arrangement: Toshiro Yabuki
 (A.C version)
 Lyrics: Masami Okui
 Composition: Toshiro Yabuki
 Arrangement: Hideki Satou
 Bay side love story ～from Tokyo～
 Anime television series Neon Genesis Evangelion insert song
 Lyrics, composition: Masami Okui
 Arrangement: Toshiro Yabuki, Tsutomu Ohira

Sources
Official website: Makusonia

Masami Okui albums
2000 live albums